A. laeta may refer to:

 Acacia laeta, a perennial legume
 Aegiphila laeta, a plant with decussate leaves
 Aloe laeta, a succulent plant
 Anilara laeta, a jewel beetle
 Aplogompha laeta, a geometer moth
 Archanara laeta, a North American moth
 Aspalathus laeta, a cape gorse